Emre is a Turkish male given name.

Emre may also refer to:

Emre, Bandırma, a village
Emre, Köprüköy
Emre (surname)
Emre (Dark Matter), a music album